Cherkovna Point (‘Nos Cherkovna’ \'nos cher-'kov-na\) is the sharp point projecting 1.7 km into the head of Barilari Bay on Graham Coast in Graham Land, Antarctica, formed by an offshoot of Mezzo Buttress.  The point is named after the settlements of Cherkovna in Northeastern Bulgaria.

Location
British mapping in 1971 and 1976.

Maps
 Antarctic Digital Database (ADD). Scale 1:250000 topographic map of Antarctica. Scientific Committee on Antarctic Research (SCAR). Since 1993, regularly upgraded and updated.
British Antarctic Territory. Scale 1:200000 topographic map. DOS 610 Series, Sheet W 65 64. Directorate of Overseas Surveys, Tolworth, UK, 1971.
British Antarctic Territory. Scale 1:200000 topographic map. DOS 610 Series, Sheet W 66 64. Directorate of Overseas Surveys, Tolworth, UK, 1976.

References
 Bulgarian Antarctic Gazetteer. Antarctic Place-names Commission. (details in Bulgarian, basic data in English)
Cherkovna Point. SCAR Composite Antarctic Gazetteer.

External links
 Cherkovna Point. Copernix satellite image

Headlands of Graham Land
Bulgaria and the Antarctic
Graham Coast